BMC Genomics is an open-access scientific journal covering all areas of genomics and proteomics. The journal was established in 2000 and is published by BioMed Central. The editor-in-chief is Matteo Pasini. Its 2021 impact factor is 4.56.

Abstracting and Indexing 
The journal is indexed in PubMed, PubMed Central, MEDLINE, BIOSIS Previews, EMBASE, Scopus, Zoological Record, and other indexing services.

References

Genetics in the United Kingdom
Genetics journals
English-language journals
BioMed Central academic journals
Publications established in 2000
Genomics journals